Big Mill Homestead is a historic residence located west of Bellevue, Iowa, United States.  It is one of over 217 limestone structures in Jackson County from the mid-19th century, of which 101 are houses.  This is one of 12 houses with a hip roof.  It was built around 1850 into the side of a hill, so the south elevation has three floors and the north elevation has two.  The cube-shaped structure features cut coursed stone with blocks of various sizes and shapes, and limestone sills and lintels.  There is no indication that this house was ever stuccoed, as several in the vicinity were.  The house was listed on the National Register of Historic Places in 1991.

References

Houses completed in 1850
Vernacular architecture in Iowa
Houses in Jackson County, Iowa
National Register of Historic Places in Jackson County, Iowa
Houses on the National Register of Historic Places in Iowa